De Kromme Watergang is a restaurant located in Slijkplaat, Hoofdplaat in the Netherlands. It is a fine dining restaurant that was awarded one Michelin star in the period 2005–2011. Much to their surprise, they were rewarded two Michelin stars in 2012. GaultMillau awarded the restaurant 18.5 out of 20 points in its guide for 2013.

De Kromme Watergang is a member of Les Patrons Cuisiniers.

See also
List of Michelin starred restaurants in the Netherlands

Sources and references 

Restaurants in the Netherlands
Michelin Guide starred restaurants in the Netherlands
De Kromme Watergang
De Kromme Watergang